Bernard Paul Quinn (born 5 May 1951) is a New Zealand businessman, former rugby union player and politician, and a member of the National Party. He was elected into the 49th New Zealand Parliament in 2008 by way of the party list and served for one term until 2011. In 2013, he had the option of returning to Parliament following the resignation of MP Jackie Blue as he was the highest ranked person on the party list, but he declined the opportunity, instead making way for Paul Foster-Bell.

Early life and education
Quinn was born on 5 May 1951, and was educated at St Joseph's College in Masterton. He went on to study at Lincoln College, graduating with a Bachelor of Agricultural Commerce in 1973.

Of Māori descent, Quinn affiliates to Ngāti Awa and Ngāi Tūhoe.

Rugby union
Quinn played rugby union for the Wellington Rugby Football Union from 1976 to 1983 (captain 1981–1983) and for New Zealand Māori between 1977 and 1982, captaining the side from 1980 to 1980 1982. He was the head coach for the Texas Rugby Union in 1987.

Quinn is a former director of the New Zealand Rugby Union since April 2002, and also served as chairman of the New Zealand Maori Rugby Board.

Member of Parliament

Quinn stood for the New Zealand National Party in the Hutt South electorate at the 2008 general election and was also ranked 48 on the party's list. Quinn finished second in Hutt South to Trevor Mallard but was elected from the party list.

In 2010 Quinn's Electoral (Disqualification of Convicted Prisoners) Amendment Bill was drawn from the member's ballot. The Bill removed voting rights for prisoners, and was declared to be inconsistent with the New Zealand Bill of Rights Act. The bill was passed into law in December 2010.

At the 2011 general election, Quinn again finished second in Hutt South and his party ranking of 55 was too low to be re-elected.

During his time in Parliament, Quinn served on the Maori Affairs Committee (9 December 2008 – 20 October 2011), Justice and Electoral Committee (9 December 2008 – 20 October 2011) and Electoral Legislation Committee (31 March 2010 – 20 October 2011).

Quinn had the opportunity to return to Parliament in mid–2013, following the resignation of MP Jackie Blue, given that he was the highest ranked person on National's party list, but he declined the opportunity to return as he had "moved on". Instead diplomat Paul Foster-Bell took the role.

Business career
Quinn has connections to the Ngāti Awa and Ngāi Tūhoe iwi and worked as a manager in the Department of Maori Affairs (now Te Puni Kōkiri) between 1979 and 1984.

Quinn is director and sole owner of "MOCOM LIMITED" (formerly called "M COMMERCE LIMITED"), was a director of the Institute of Geological and Nuclear Sciences from 1992–1998 and is a member of the New Zealand Institute of Directors.  He is also a director of White Island Tours, which ran tours to Whakaari/White Island, up to and including its eruption in 2019.

References

External links
  Parliamentary biography
 National Party website
 NZRU Biography

1951 births
Living people
New Zealand National Party MPs
New Zealand rugby union players
Māori All Blacks players
Māori MPs
New Zealand list MPs
New Zealand sportsperson-politicians
Unsuccessful candidates in the 2011 New Zealand general election
Members of the New Zealand House of Representatives
21st-century New Zealand politicians
Ngāti Awa people
Ngāi Tūhoe people
Lincoln University (New Zealand) alumni
New Zealand rugby union coaches
People educated at Chanel College, Masterton